After Dark or After Dark: A Tale of London Life is an 1868 melodramatic play by the Irish writer Dion Boucicault. It includes a scene where a character is tied up on railroad tracks as a train approaches. Boucicault was successfully sued for copyright infringement by Augustin Daly, whose play Under the Gaslight featured a similar scene the year before.

Film adaptations
The play was turned into two films in 1915. An American film After Dark starring Eric Maxon and the British After Dark directed by Warwick Buckland.

References

Bibliography
 
 

1868 plays
British plays adapted into films
Plays set in London
Plays by Dion Boucicault